Sagnarigu Municipal District is one of the sixteen districts in Northern Region, Ghana. Originally it was formerly part of the then-larger Tamale Municipal District in 1988, which was created from the former West Dagomba District Council, until a small northern part of the district was split off to create Sagnarigu District on 24 June 2012; thus the remaining part has been retained as Tamale Metropolitan District (which it was elevated to metropolitan district assembly status in August 2004). However, on 15 March 2018, it was elevated to municipal district assembly status to become Sagnarigu Municipal District. The municipality is located in the northwest part of Northern Region and has Sagnarigu as its capital city (which is also the capital city of the Northern Region).

Mariam Iddrisu is the Metropolitan Chief Executive of Sagnarigu Municipality in Ghana's Northern Region.

Communities 
The communities includes:

Sagnarigu

Kpalsi

Sanarigu Kukuo

Gurugu

Katariga

Malishegu

References

Districts of the Northern Region (Ghana)